Tigerville may refer to:

Tigerville, Louisiana
Tigerville, South Carolina
Tigerville, South Dakota
Tigerville, California